William Courtland Lantaff (July 31, 1913 – January 28, 1970) was an American lawyer, jurist, and politician who served as a Democratic U.S. Representative from Florida. He also served as State court judge in Florida and as a member of the Florida House of Representatives.

Life and career
Lantaff's family moved to Jacksonville, Florida in 1921 and to Miami, Florida in 1929. He graduated from the University of Florida (where he was a member of Phi Kappa Tau fraternity) in 1935 and from the University of Florida College of Law in 1936. He was admitted to the Florida bar in 1937 and practiced law in Miami, serving as assistant city judge of Miami Beach in 1939 and 1940.

He was inducted into the Florida National Guard as a first lieutenant in January 1941 where he served as executive officer for the Military Intelligence Division of the War Department General Staff. He was discharged as a lieutenant colonel in November 1945 but returned to active duty from September through December 1950, while he was running for Congress.

He appeared on the January 25, 1953 episode of the panel show What's My Line? as a contestant.

Lantaff was a delegate to the 1956 and 1960 Democratic National Conventions. At the conclusion of his political career, he returned to the law and was involved in banking and advertising. In 1967, he became a founding board member of the Dade Community Foundation.

Death
He died in 1970 at the age of 56 and is buried in Woodlawn Park Cemetery and Mausoleum (now Caballero Rivero Woodlawn North Park Cemetery and Mausoleum), Miami.

References

External links 

1913 births
1970 deaths
Politicians from Buffalo, New York
Florida state court judges
Democratic Party members of the Florida House of Representatives
University of Florida alumni
Businesspeople from Florida
Democratic Party members of the United States House of Representatives from Florida
Florida lawyers
20th-century American businesspeople
20th-century American politicians
20th-century American judges
Lawyers from Buffalo, New York
Fredric G. Levin College of Law alumni
20th-century American lawyers